Manuel Solís Palma (3 December 1917 in Los Santos Province – 6 November 2009) was the acting president of Panama from 26 February 1988 to 1 September 1989, under the military rule of Manuel Noriega. He served as education minister in several administrations, and worked on the 1968 presidential campaign of Arnulfo Arias Madrid.

In February 1988, Noriega promoted Solís from education minister to president after the firing of president Eric Arturo Delvalle. The US administration of president Ronald Reagan refused to recognize Solís or the diplomats representing him as legitimate. In May, the administration offered a deal in which Noriega would leave office in exchange for the US dropping drug charges against him; however, the Panamanian military rejected the terms, which gave no guarantee that Solís would retain power. Solís served until 1 September 1989, shortly before the US invasion of Panama which deposed Noriega. He was later described as one of a series of Noriega's puppet rulers, nicknamed the "Kleenex presidents" in Panama due to their "disposability". In 1994, he was pardoned by President Guillermo Endara for any crimes committed during the Noriega years.

In the administration of Martín Torrijos (2004–2009), Solís served again as advisor to the education minister.

He died on 6 November 2009, aged 91, from pulmonary edema in Panama City.

References

External links 
Manuel Solís' obituary 

1917 births
2009 deaths
People from Los Santos Province
Presidents of Panama
Respiratory disease deaths in Panama
Deaths from pulmonary edema
Education ministers of Panama
Democratic Revolutionary Party politicians